Kim Heacox is an American writer and photographer living in Gustavus, Alaska, next to Glacier Bay National Park. He was born in Lewiston, Idaho and grew up in Spokane, Washington.

Background
Heacox first arrived in Alaska in 1979 as a new park ranger in Glacier Bay National Monument (today Glacier Bay National Park and Preserve). His memoir, The Only Kayak (2006, a PEN USA Western Book Award finalist), describes that first summer in Alaska. Heacox has authored 15 books, including five published by National Geographic. His novel, Jimmy Bluefeather (2015), is the only work of fiction in over 20 years to win the National Outdoor Book Award. He has written opinion-editorials for The Guardian, the Los Angeles Times, and the Anchorage Daily News. He appears in the 2009 Ken Burns film The National Parks and has been featured on NPR's Living on Earth (discussing his biography, John Muir and the Ice That Started a Fire).

A 2021 newspaper article argued that political systems must become long‑sighted if humanity is to face any kind of reasonable future.

Awards
Jimmy Bluefeather - the National Outdoor Book Award, 2015
 The Lowell Thomas Award for excellence in travel journalism (won twice)

Bibliography 

 The National Parks: An Illustrated History (2015)
 Jimmy Bluefeather (2015, National Outdoor Book Award winner; Banff Mountain Book Award finalist)
 Rhythm of the Wild (2015)
 John Muir and the Ice That Started a Fire (2014)
 The Only Kayak (2005, PEN USA Western Book Award finalist)
 Caribou Crossing (2001)
 An American Idea: The Making of the National Parks (2001)
 Shackleton: The Antarctic Challenge (1999)
 Antarctica: The Last Continent (1998)
 Alaska Light (1998, photography by author)
 Alaska’s Inside Passage (1997, photography by author)
 Visions of a Wild America (1996)
 In Denali (1992, Benjamin Franklin Science/Nature Book Award winner, photography by author)
 Iditarod Spirit (1991, photography by author)
 Alaska’s National Parks (1990, photography by Fred Hirschmann)
 Bush Pilots of Alaska (1989, photography by Fred Hirschmann)

References

Date of birth missing (living people)
Living people
American male writers
American environmentalists
American photographers
People from Lewiston, Idaho
People from Spokane, Washington
Writers from Alaska
Year of birth missing (living people)